The rainforest tube-nosed bat (Murina pluvialis) is a species of vesper bats (Vespertilionidae). It is found in India.

References

Murininae
Mammals of India
Mammals described in 2012